Antirhea tomentosa is a species of plant in the family Rubiaceae. It is endemic to Jamaica.  It is threatened by habitat loss. The species was first discovered in 1780 and rediscovered in 1975, making it a Lazarus taxon.

References
 

tom
Endemic flora of Jamaica
Critically endangered plants
Taxonomy articles created by Polbot
Taxobox binomials not recognized by IUCN